Žlan is a small settlement in the Municipality of Bohinj in the Upper Carniola region of Slovenia. It only has six houses and no longer has any permanent residents.

Name
Žlan was attested in historical sources as Schlan and Shlan in 1763–1787. It may be a borrowing from Bavarian German *Schlewn, which is presumed borrowed from Slovene žleb 'gorge, ravine', thus referring to the local geography.

References

External links

Žlan at Geopedia

Populated places in the Municipality of Bohinj